The Slow Professor: Challenging the Culture of Speed in the Academy (cloth ; paper ; EPUB e-book ) is a book by Maggie Berg and Barbara K. Seeber published by University of Toronto Press. The authors challenge the haste in modern universities caused by their corporatization.

External links
Review by University of Toronto Press
Review by the Canadian Association of University Teachers
Review by National Public Radio

2016 non-fiction books
Books about higher education
Education finance
Slow movement
University of Toronto Press books